Hanazono Station may refer to one of the following train stations in Japan:

 Fukaya Hanazono Station, in Saitama Prefecture
 Hanazono Station (Kagawa), in Kagawa Prefecture
 Hanazono Station (Kyoto), in Kyoto Prefecture
 Kawachi-Hanazono Station, in Osaka Prefecture